The Irishman: In Conversation is a 2019 documentary short film starring Martin Scorsese, Robert De Niro, Al Pacino and Joe Pesci. The premise revolves around Scorsese speaking with De Niro, Pacino, and Pesci about their film The Irishman.

Cast 
 Robert De Niro
 Al Pacino
 Joe Pesci
 Martin Scorsese

Release 
The Irishman: In Conversation was released on November 27, 2019.

References

External links
 
 

Netflix specials
2010s English-language films